Assam State Electricity Board Sports Club, or A.S.E.B Sports Club, is an Indian professional football club based in Guwahati, Assam. The club competes in GSA (Guwahati Sports Association) Super Division Football League, Bordoloi Trophy, A.T.P.A. Shield, Independence Day Cup, Bodousa Cup and other tournaments of Assam.

History
ASEB Sports Club was founded in 1975 to promote and encourage sports activities among its members. It has won most number of titles in the GSA Super Division Football League. The club also participated in the National Football League II (NFL 2nd Division), then second tier of Indian football league system in the 2001-02, 2002–03, 2003–04, 2004-05 seasons.The three successor companies of erstwhile Assam State Electricity Board - Assam Power Distribution Company Limited (APDCL), Assam Electricity Grid Corporation Limited (AEGCL) and Assam Power Generation Corporation Limited (APGCL) are currently the owners of the club.

Home ground
ASEB SC plays all its home matches at the Nehru Stadium in Guwahati, which has a capacity of 15,000 spectators.

2019 squad

Honours

League
Assam Club Championship 
 Champions (2) 2004, 2006
 Runners-up (4): 2001, 2002, 2003, 2007
GSA Super Division Football League
 Champions (12) Latest in 2022

Cup
Bordoloi Trophy
 Winners (5): 1988, 2006, 2009, 2014, 2021
 Runners-up (4): 1999, 2002, 2008, 2019
ATPA Shield
 Winners (5): 2000, 2001, 2006, 2011, 2022
 Runners-up (3): 2004, 2008, 2019
Independence Day Cup 
 Winners (4): 1986, 1995, 2015, 2021
 Runners-up (1): 2016
Bodousa Cup
 Runners-up (2): 2016, 2020
NN Bhattacharya Knock-Out  Football Tournament
 Winners (1): 2015
 Runners-up (1): 2014
Bodoland Martyrs Gold Cup
 Runners-up (1): 2010
Amba Medhi Football Tournament
 Winners (1): 2002
Naroram Barman Memorial Trophy
 Winners: 2010
Sohanlal Dugar Shield
 Winners (1): 2000

See also
 List of football clubs in Assam

References

Football clubs in Assam
Works association football clubs in India
1975 establishments in Assam
Association football clubs established in 1975